The  is a dual-screen handheld game console developed and manufactured by Nintendo. It is the second iteration of the Nintendo DS and is slimmer, brighter, and more lightweight than the original. It was announced on January 26, 2006, more than a month before its initial release in Japan on March 2, 2006 due to overwhelming demand for the original model. It has been released in Australia, North America, Europe, New Zealand, Singapore, and defined regions in South America, the Middle East, and East Asia. As of March 31, 2014, the DS Lite had shipped 93.86 million units worldwide.

Release
The Nintendo DS Lite was announced on January 26, 2006.

In Japan, the Nintendo DS Lite was released on March 2, 2006. Due to lack of supply and excessive demand following the launch, many electronics distributors raised the retail price of the redesigned handheld console. Even though Nintendo managed to release 550,000 units in March 2006 (which was above their initial projections), the DS Lite was sold out soon after its launch. The shortage was supposed to be eased after Nintendo released 700,000 Nintendo DS Lites during April 2006; however, retailers in Tokyo sold out yet again by late May 2006. This shortage would last for most of 2006 and 2007 with retailers all around the country having permanent ads apologizing for the shortage and announcing the ignorance of when a restock would arrive. When the product arrived, it would sell out within days. Since restocking was erratic, looking for the product often involved several visits to different retailers, and most of the time without finding the product. This was still the case in Japan as of April 25, 2007, with stores turning away potential customers every day and selling out quickly.

The Nintendo DS Lite was released in Australia on June 1, 2006 and came with a demo for Dr. Kawashima's Brain Training: How Old Is Your Brain?.

The Nintendo DS Lite was released in North America on June 11, 2006. There had been various reports of North American Target, Wal-Mart, Kmart, and Meijer stores having sold Nintendo DS Lite units as early as May 30, 2006, breaking the official launch date. On June 12, 2006, GameSpot reported that the Nintendo DS Lites had sold out at major online retailers, as well as several brick-and-mortar stores in North America. On June 13, 2006, Nintendo announced that 136,500 units were sold in two days since the DS Lite went on sale in North America, and seemed to be on pace to the 500,000 sold by the original Nintendo DS in its first ten days. Shortly after its launch, the DS Lite was sold out at major US retailers; however, it did not have the same ongoing shortages in the US as it did in Japan through 2006 and 2007.

The Nintendo DS Lite was released in Europe on June 23, 2006. In Finland and Sweden, the DS Lite was released on June 22, 2006, due to Midsummer. In just 10 days, Nintendo announced it had sold 200,000 Nintendo DS Lites in Europe. On June 12, 2006, Chinese media organization Sina.com reported that a container intended for shipment to Europe was stolen, which contained 18 million (2.32 million) worth of goods, including black Nintendo DS Lite consoles and games. Later, GamesIndustry.biz reported that Nintendo had confirmed that "A number of White DS Lite made for the UK market were stolen in Hong Kong."

Nintendo opened its subsidiary, Nintendo of Korea, on July 20, 2006. The DS Lite was the first console to be released in South Korea by the subsidiary, being released on January 18, 2007. Popular Korean actors Jang Dong-gun and Ahn Sung-ki were enlisted to help promote the console. Nintendo of Korea stated they had sold more than one million units in the first year of sale with around 1.4 million sold as of April 2008.

The DS Lite was reportedly discontinued in April 2011.

Unreleased larger model
A larger model of the DS Lite was an unreleased alternative to the DS Lite. It was ready for mass production, but Nintendo decided against its release as sales of the DS Lite were still strong. Instead, Nintendo released the Nintendo DSi in 2008 and a larger version of the DSi a year later.

Hardware

The top screen is a backlit, 3.12-inch, transmissive TFT color LCD with 256x192-pixel resolution and .24mm dot pitch, capable of displaying a total of 262,144 colors. The touch screen has the same specifications as the top screen, but with a transparent analog touch sensor. The screens have a maximum brightness of up to 200cd/m2 for the top screen and 190cd/m2 for the bottom screen (touch screen).

The CPU consists of two ARM processors, an ARM946E-S main CPU and ARM7TDMI coprocessor at clock speeds of 67MHz and 33MHz respectively. The Lithium-ion battery (1000 mAh) is capable of delivering 15 to 19 hours of play time on a single charge; a power-saving sleep mode is also available. The console takes roughly three-hours to fully charge the battery. The DS Lite uses an AC power adapter that differs from the one used for the original Nintendo DS and Game Boy Advance SP due to a smaller adaptor AC port on the top of the unit.

The DS Lite supports IEEE 802.11 wireless communication with a wireless range of 30 to 100 feet. Multiple users can play certain multiplayer games with one DS game card using DS Download Play. The DS Lite is capable of receiving Wi-Fi signals from other systems in the Nintendo DS and 3DS families, Wii consoles, and Wi-Fi access points. WEP encrypted and unencrypted networks are supported. WPA encryption is not supported.

Along with a touch screen, the Nintendo DS Lite has A/B/X/Y face buttons, a directional control pad, L/R shoulder buttons, Start and Select buttons, a volume slider, and a power switch. The included stylus is 1cm longer and 2mm thicker than the stylus of the original Nintendo DS. The stereo speakers can provide virtual surround sound, depending on the software. It has terminals for stereo headphones and an embedded microphone for voice recognition.

Like the original DS, the Nintendo DS Lite is compatible with Game Boy Advance Game Paks as well as Nintendo DS game cards. The DS Lite has a DS slot on top and a Game Boy slot on the bottom. A removable cover for the Game Boy Advance Game Pak slot provides added protection from dust and other foreign materials.

Numerous colors and limited editions were released.

Software

The Nintendo DS Lite includes embedded PictoChat software that allows up to 16 users within local range of one another to chat at once. Also included are a real-time clock, an alarm, and touch-screen calibration. The alarm can only be activated if the power is on.

Sales

Notes

References

External links

 Official websites
Official Nintendo DS Lite website (Australia)
Official Nintendo DS Lite website (South Korea)
Official Nintendo DS Lite website (Canada)
Official Nintendo DS Lite website (Europe)
Official Nintendo DS Lite website (United States)

Nintendo DS
2000s toys
2010s toys
Backward-compatible video game consoles
Discontinued handheld game consoles
IQue consoles
Products and services discontinued in 2014
Products introduced in 2006
Regionless game consoles

de:Nintendo DS#Nintendo DS Lite